The Book of Souls: Live Chapter is a live album and video by Iron Maiden, recorded throughout their 2016–2017 The Book of Souls World Tour. Released on 17 November 2017, the album was produced by Tony Newton, with Steve Harris serving as co-producer. This makes it the band's first live album since 2002's Beast over Hammersmith not to be produced by Kevin Shirley.

On 11 November, the video was livestreamed on YouTube. It is also available for digital purchase alongside its audio counterpart, with no physical edition announced.

Track listing

Personnel

Iron Maiden 

Bruce Dickinson – lead vocals
Dave Murray – guitars
Janick Gers – guitars
Adrian Smith – guitars, backing vocals
Steve Harris – bass, backing vocals
Nicko McBrain – drums

Additional musicians 

Michael Kenney - keyboards

Technical personnel 
Tony Newton - recording, production, engineering, mixing
Ade Emsley - mastering
Hervé Monjeaud - illustrations
Anthony Dry - illustrations
Stuart Crouch - artwork
John McMurtrie - photography
Justin de Reuck - photography
Rod Smallwood - management
Andy Taylor - management
Dave Shack - management

Charts

References

Iron Maiden video albums
Iron Maiden live albums
Live video albums
2017 video albums
2017 live albums
Live heavy metal albums